Kazemabad (also Romanized as Kāz̧emābād) is a village in Sahrarud Rural District, in the Central District of Fasa County, Fars Province, Iran. At the 2006 census, its population was 449, in 107 families.

References 

Populated places in Fasa County